The St. Johns Library is a branch of the Multnomah County Library, in St. Johns, Portland, Oregon. Operating at the same location since 1913, it underwent major renovation in 2000 to upgrade its infrastructure, expand its floor area, and increase its holding capacity to 25,000 volumes. The branch offers the Multnomah County Library catalog of two million books, periodicals and other materials.

History
Early public library services in the St. Johns neighborhood began in 1903, when the Library Association of Portland established a small "deposit station" of books at a public school on the peninsula between the Columbia and Willamette rivers. In 1907, the St. Johns Reading Room and the Peninsular Reading Room, each with a collection of 200 to 300 books and a few reference works, offered public library services. These early ventures led to the opening of a St. Johns branch of Portland's central library on November 22, 1913.

The building housed a baby clinic as well as a library from 1918 through the 1950s. During World War II, the Rations Board had an office in the building, and library patrons included a wide variety of newcomers who worked during the war in the nearby shipyards. 

After Multnomah County voters passed a bond measure in 1996 to renovate branch libraries, St. Johns Library was among four branches qualifying for significant upgrades. It closed for renovation of its plumbing, wiring, and other systems in March 2000 and reopened on February 13, 2001. Self-checkout stations and security gates were installed in 2011.

References

External links

 Image: St. Johns Library, Multnomah County Library

1913 establishments in Oregon
Buildings and structures in St. Johns, Portland, Oregon
Libraries established in 1913
Libraries in Portland, Oregon
Library buildings completed in 1913
Multnomah County Library